Naniwa may refer to:

 Naniwa-kyō, the place that became the modern Japanese city of Osaka
 Naniwa-ku, Osaka, one of the 24 wards of Osaka City, Japan
 Japanese cruiser Naniwa, the first protected cruiser built specifically for the Imperial Japanese Navy

See also
 Namba